Syllitus is a genus of long-horned beetles in the family Cerambycidae. There are more than 40 described species in Syllitus.

Species
These 47 species belong to the genus Syllitus:

 Syllitus acanthias McKeown, 1937
 Syllitus adonarensis Jordan, 1894
 Syllitus albipennis Pascoe, 1869
 Syllitus araucariae McKeown, 1938
 Syllitus argillaceus McKeown, 1937
 Syllitus bellulus McKeown, 1942
 Syllitus beltrani Cerda, 1968
 Syllitus bicolor (Schwarzer, 1924)
 Syllitus bipunctatus Waterhouse, 1877
 Syllitus brimblecombei McKeown, 1938
 Syllitus buloloensis Gressitt, 1959
 Syllitus cassiniae McKeown, 1938
 Syllitus centocrus McKeown, 1938
 Syllitus cylindricus Germain, 1899
 Syllitus deustus (Newman, 1841)
 Syllitus divergens McKeown, 1937
 Syllitus dubius McKeown, 1938
 Syllitus elguetai Cerda, 1991
 Syllitus froggatti McKeown, 1937
 Syllitus fulvipennis Gahan, 1893
 Syllitus grammicus (Newman, 1840)
 Syllitus heros Blackburn, 1900
 Syllitus insularis Gressitt, 1959
 Syllitus leoensis Gilmour, 1961
 Syllitus microps Blackburn, 1900
 Syllitus minor Gressitt, 1959
 Syllitus minutus McKeown, 1937
 Syllitus niger Gressitt, 1959
 Syllitus papuanus Gestro, 1875
 Syllitus parryi Pascoe, 1862
 Syllitus pseudocupes (Fairmaire & Germain, 1864)
 Syllitus rectus (Newman, 1841)
 Syllitus schajovskoii Bosq, 1953
 Syllitus sexlineatus Gressitt, 1951
 Syllitus sinuaticosta McKeown, 1938
 Syllitus sinuatus McKeown, 1937
 Syllitus spinosus Gahan, 1915
 Syllitus stellamontis Gressitt, 1959
 Syllitus sumbae Franz, 1972
 Syllitus sutteri Franz, 1972
 Syllitus tabidus Pascoe, 1871
 Syllitus terminatus Pascoe, 1871
 Syllitus timorensis Gilmour, 1961
 Syllitus tuberculatus McKeown, 1938
 Syllitus undulatus Heller, 1914
 Syllitus uniformis Blackburn, 1893
 Syllitus unistriatus McKeown, 1942

References

Further reading

 

Cerambycidae
Articles created by Qbugbot